The 1500th Air Transport Wing (ATW) is a discontinued United States Air Force unit.  It was last active in 1971 at Hickam Air Force Base, Hawaii under the designation 6486th Air Base Wing (ABW). The 1500th ATW was a heavy cargo transport wing of Military Air Transport Service (MATS), formed on 1 June 1949.  In 1952 the wing lost its operational elements and became the base support element for Hickam until it was replaced by the 15th Air Base Wing in 1971.

History

1500th Air Transport Group
Military Air Transport Service assumed responsibility for the strategic airlift mission previously carried out by the Air Transport Command (ATC), transporting cargo and personnel to destinations within the Pacific and the Continental United States.   It organized the 531st Air Transport Group (ATG) at Hickam to replace ATC's 1521st Air Force Base Unit (Air Transport).  The group was initially equipped with three squadrons of C-54 Skymasters that could reach the Continental US, but required intermediate stopovers along the Pacific transport routes to stations as far away as Pakistan.   The unit also had association with Naval Air Transport squadrons assigned to Hickam as part of the joint service organization of MATS.  The group was a tenant organization at Hickam, which was a Pacific Air Command (PAC) Base. In October 1948, the group was redesignated the 1500th ATG when MATS renumbered its Table of Distribution (TD) units to conform to USAF policy that its TD units be numbered between 1200 and 2100.

1500th Air Transport Wing
In 1949, Hickam transferred from PAC to MATS, and MATS organized the 1500th Air Transport Wing as the overall headquarters for the 1500th ATG and support organizations to operate Hickam. In 1949, MATS reorganized its units at Hickam and the wing briefly lost its host responsibilities for Hickam and its operational squadrons.  It soon received C-54 squadrons, which were transferred from the 1501st ATW at Fairfeld-Susun (later Travis) AFB.   It received its first long-range C-97 Stratofreighter aircraft and two additional squadrons in 1951.

The wing reorganized in May 1952 as the 1500th Air Base Wing and the 1500th Air Transport Group was reassigned to Pacific Division, MATS.  The wing continued as a support organization for Hickam and the Pacific Division until 1954.  At that time, in anticipation of the transfer of Hickam to Far East Air Forces (later Pacific Air Forces) (PACAF), the wing was reassigned and renumbered as the 6486th Air Base Wing to reflect its new assignment. It remained the host at Hickam until being replaced by the 15th ABW in a USAF program to continue the histories of notable combat units.

Major airlifts
 In 1950, An earthquake in New Delhi brought MATS aircraft into Dum Dum Airport, Calcutta, with emergency medical supplies.
 During the Korean War, MATS airlifted nearly 50,000 combat casualties and patients to the United States.
 In 1952, when Typhoon Olive struck the island, MATS aircraft flew in fresh water, food, medicine, cots, and blankets, and helped evacuate more than 450 people to Hawaii and Guam.
 MATS supported nuclear weapons testing at the Eniwetok Proving Ground by airlifting more than 14,000 tons of cargo and 13,000 personnel, as well as providing 1,100 of its own technical personnel.

Lineage

1500th Air Transport Wing
 Designated as the 1500th Air Transport Wing and organized, 1 June 1949
 Redesignated as 1500th Air Base Wing on 17 May 1952
 Redesignated as 6486th Air Base Wing on 15 October 1954
 Inactivated on 1 July 1971

1500th Air Transport Group
 Designated as the 531st Air Transport Group on 14 May 1948
 Organized on 1 Jun 1948
 Redesignated as 1500th Air Transport Group on 1 October 1948
 Redesignated as 1502d Air Transport Group on 1 Jul 1955
 Discontinued on 15 May 1958

Assignments
 Pacific Division, MATS, 1 Jun 1948
 Far East Air Forces, (later Pacific Air Forces), 15 October 1954 – 1 July 1971

Components
Groups
 1500th Air Transport Group
 1st Air Transport Squadron (later 1263d Air Transport Squadron), 1 Jun 1948 – 17 Jun 1949
 2d Air Transport Squadron (later 1264th Air Transport Squadron), 1 Jun 1948 – 1 Jun 1949
 4th Air Transport Squadron (later 1265th Air Transport Squadron), 1 Jun 1948 – 23 Apr 1949
 47th Air Transport Squadron, Medium, 20 Jul 1952 – 15 May 1958
 48th Air Transport Squadron, Heavy, 20 Jul 1952 – 15 May 1958
 49th Air Transport Squadron, Heavy, 20 Jul 1952 – 1 Jul 1955
 50th Air Transport Squadron, Heavy, 20 Jul 1952 – 15 May 1958
 51st Air Transport Squadron, 20 Jul 1952 – 1 Jul 1955
 1263d Air Transport Squadron, 30 Jun 1949 – 20 July 1952
 Elements deployed to Tachikawa Airfield, Japan during 1951–1952 flying combat resupply missions during Korean War
 1264th Air Transport Squadron, 13 Oct 1949 – 20 July 1952
 1266th Air Transport Squadron, 30 Jun 1949 – 20 July 1952
 1267th Air Transport Squadron, 13 Oct 1949 – 24 May 1950
 1268th Air Transport Squadron, 30 Jun 1949 – 20 July 1952
 1283d Air Transport Squadron, 24 Oct 1951 – 1 Jun 1952
 1284th Air Transport Squadron, 24 Oct 1951 – 1 Jun 1952
 6486th Air Base Group, 8 Oct 1955 – 10 Apr 1959

Squadrons
 9th Airborne Command and Control Squadron, 15 Oct 1969 – 1 July 1971
 6486th Airborne Command and Control Squadron, 5 Apr 1965 – 15 Oct 1969

Stations
 Hickam Air Force Base, Hawaii, 1 Jun 1949 – 1 Jul 1971

Aircraft
 C-54 Skymaster
 1st, 2d, 3d Air Transport Squadrons, 1948–1949
 1263d, 1264th, 1265th, 1266th, 1268th Air Transport Squadrons, 1949–1952
 1267th Air Transport Squadron, 1949–1950
 1283d, 1284th Air Transport Squadrons, 1951–1952
 C-97 Stratofreighter
 1283d, 1284th Air Transport Squadrons, 1951–1952
 47th, 48th, 49th, 50th, 51st Air Transport Squadrons. 1952–1955
Note: 1284th Air Transport Squadron (later 50th ATS) operated a VC-97 version of Stratofreighter, 1951–1966 for VIP/Special Air Missions.

Notes and references

   Air Force History Index.org, Individual squadron lookups in AFHRA archives
 

Four Digit Wings of the United States Air Force
Military units and formations established in 1949
Military units and formations disestablished in 1971
1949 establishments in Hawaii
1971 disestablishments in Hawaii